Clifton Eugene "Cliff" Hayes Jr. (born October 11, 1967) is a member of the Virginia House of Delegates. He served on the Chesapeake City Council from 2004 to 2012 and was elected to represent Virginia's 77th House of Delegates district in November 2016. He has worked for Norfolk Public Schools and the Chesapeake Sheriff's Office in Information Technology.

Hayes currently serves as the chair of the Communications, Technology and Innovation Committee and as the chair of the Appropriations - Capital Outlay Subcommittee.

References

Democratic Party members of the Virginia House of Delegates
African-American state legislators in Virginia
Living people
21st-century American politicians
Norfolk State University alumni
Politicians from Chesapeake, Virginia
1967 births
21st-century African-American politicians
20th-century African-American people